Henchy is a surname. Notable people with the surname include:

Chris Henchy (born 1964), American screenwriter and film producer
David O'Connor Henchy (1810–1876), Irish politician
Edward Henchy (died  1895), American Catholic priest
Florence Henchy (Florence Hensey), Irish-born French spy
Séamus Henchy (1917-2009), Irish judge